Luca Giuliani (born 18 April 1950 in Florence, Italy) is a professor at the Humboldt University specialising in Greek and Roman archaeology.

Career 
Giuliani was curator at the Berliner Antikensammlung from 1982 to 1992. He was a lecturer at the Freie Universität Institute of Classical Archaeology between 1986 and 1991 and became Professor of Greek and Roman archaeology at the University of Freiburg in 1992 through to 1998 and then at the Ludwig Maximilian University of Munich to 2007. Since April 2007 he has been the Rector of the Wissenschaftskolleg zu Berlin (Institute for Advanced Study).

Bibliography

References

Italian archaeologists
1950 births
Living people
Academic staff of the Humboldt University of Berlin
Archaeologists from Florence
Archaeologists from Berlin